St. Mary's School is a private, Roman Catholic school in Sleepy Eye, Minnesota.  It is located in the Roman Catholic Diocese of New Ulm.

Background
St. Mary's School was established in 1883.  The High School was established in 1914

Sports
St. Mary's High School is a part of the Tomahawk Conference.

Notes and references

External links
 
 Parish Website

Roman Catholic Diocese of New Ulm
Catholic secondary schools in Minnesota
Schools in Brown County, Minnesota
Educational institutions established in 1914
1914 establishments in Minnesota